Assaad Feddah (born September 5, 1938), is a Syrian director and actor.

Biography 
His works varied between television, cinema, and even on stage. He is the husband of the late artist Maha Al-Saleh, and he has a son from her.
 In 2019 few media sources circulate rumors about his death which he denied later.

Awards and achievements 
 He won many awards as the best actor and appreciation prizes from the Damascus International Film Festival and the Cairo Festival for Radio and Television. He was also honored in 2006 by naming the "National Theater Hall" in Latakia under the name of "The Artist Asaad Faddah Theater."
 Best Actor Award for the role of (Jackal Nights) at the Damascus Film Festival.
 The best historical role award for his role in the series (Al-Awsaj) at the Cairo Radio and Television Festival.
 Appreciation award for his role in the series (Al-Jawareh) at the Cairo Radio and Television Festival.
 Local, Arab and international certificates of honor and appreciation from the public and private sectors in the field of radio, television, cinema and theater.

References

External links 
 
 Official website

Syrian Alawites
Syrian filmmakers
Syrian film directors
Syrian actors
1938 births
Living people